Michael Patrick Byrne  (20 March 1880 – 1931) was an English footballer who played as a goalkeeper for various clubs in the 1900s.

Football career
Byrne was born in Bristol and after serving in the Grenadier Guards and the Gloucestershire Regiment, joined Bristol Rovers of the Southern League in 1902. The following season, he moved to join the Southern League champions, Southampton as cover for George Clawley. He made his debut in a 2–0 victory over Swindon Town on 23 January 1904, and followed this with a clean sheet in the next match before Clawley's return. He made three further appearances (all victories, with two further clean sheets) before a move to Chelsea in August 1905, for their inaugural season in the Football League.

At Chelsea, he was at first the understudy to William "Fatty" Foulke, making four appearances in the 1905–06 season. Following Foulke's departure at the end of the season, Bob Whiting was promoted to the first-choice 'keeper, helping Chelsea gain promotion to the First Division at the end of the season, in which Byrne made a single appearance.

Byrne then moved on to join Glossop, where he made 11 Second Division appearances before retiring in 1908.

Later career
Byrne later returned to Bristol to settle and took up employment with the Imperial Tobacco Company. He served as a private in the Royal Defence Corps during the First World War.

References

External links
Chelsea career summary

1880 births
Footballers from Bristol
English footballers
Association football goalkeepers
Bristol Rovers F.C. players
Southampton F.C. players
Chelsea F.C. players
Glossop North End A.F.C. players
Southern Football League players
English Football League players
1931 deaths
Grenadier Guards soldiers
Gloucestershire Regiment soldiers
Royal Defence Corps soldiers
British Army personnel of World War I
British Army personnel of the Second Boer War
Military personnel from Bristol